Ingolf Elster Christensen (28 March 1872 in Førde – 3 May 1943 in Førde) was a Norwegian jurist, military officer, county governor, and Member of Parliament from the Conservative Party.

Biography

Christensen was born at Sunnfjord in Sogn og Fjordane, Norway. He was the son of Michael Sundt Tuchsen Christensen (1827–95) and Frederikke Sophie Elster (1838–1927). He was a brother of author and critic Hjalmar Christensen.

Christensen graduated from Bergen Cathedral School in 1889 and then went to the Norwegian Military Academy, where he graduated as an officer in 1893. He was appointed governor of the County of Nordre Bergenhus in 1910 and held the position until 1929 (in 1919 the county was renamed Sogn og Fjordane). He was subsequently county governor of Oslo and Akershus from 1929 to 1941.

He was Minister of Justice in 1926, Minister of Defense 1926–1928, Member of Parliament 1922-1924 and 1925-1927 and was a member of the Executive Board of the Conservative Party. 

After the German invasion of Norway in April 1940, he was elected Chairman of the new Administrative Council that was put up by the Norwegian Supreme Court and functioned from April to September 1940. The council held negotiations with the Germans and Christensen was regarded by the Germans as a possible leader of a suggested Riksråd that should govern Norway. The negotiations however failed and came to an end in September 1940. He then returned to his office as county governor until 1941 when he was replaced by a member of Nasjonal Samling. After that he withdrew to his family farm and did not play a political role any longer.

References 

1872 births
1943 deaths
People from Førde
People educated at the Bergen Cathedral School
Norwegian jurists
Norwegian Army personnel
Ministers of Justice of Norway
Defence ministers of Norway